Kuoy Bunroeun (born February 12, 1967) is a Cambodian politician belonging to the Cambodia National Rescue Party representing Kampong Cham Province. He was also a Sam Rainsy Party member representing Takeo Province in the 4th Mandate (2003-2008). He was replaced by Sam Rainsy in 2014 who was barred from running in the election.

References 

Members of the National Assembly (Cambodia)
Living people
Cambodia National Rescue Party politicians
Candlelight Party politicians
1967 births
People from Siem Reap province